Stephen Anthony Farry MP (born 22 April 1971) is an Alliance Party of Northern Ireland politician.

He served as a Member of the Legislative Assembly (MLA) for North Down from 2007 to 2019, and was Minister for Employment and Learning in the Northern Ireland Executive until the post was abolished in 2016. In December 2019, he was elected to the United Kingdom House of Commons as the Member of Parliament (MP) for the North Down constituency.

Farry has served as the Deputy Leader of the Alliance Party since December 2016.

Early life and career
Farry is the son of Vincent Farry and Margaret Farry (née Greer). He graduated from Queen's University, Belfast in 1992 with a BSSc in Politics and a PhD in International Relations in 2000. He was elected to the Assembly in the 2007 election for North Down, having first been elected to North Down Borough Council in 1993. In 1996, he was an unsuccessful candidate in the Northern Ireland Forum election in Fermanagh and South Tyrone. In the 2010 United Kingdom general election, he contested North Down but came in third place.

He is a former General Secretary of the Alliance Party of Northern Ireland. He was appointed an International Peace Scholar by the US Institute of Peace in 2005. In 2007, he became Mayor of North Down.

Political career

Minister for Employment and Learning 
Farry held his North Down seat in the 2011 Assembly election, and was subsequently appointed Minister for Employment and Learning in the 4th Northern Ireland Executive.

In September 2011, Farry announced a freeze on tuition fees in Northern Ireland, with fees only subject to an inflationary rise.

Following the decision by Alliance Party councillors to vote in favour of restricting the flying of the Union flag at Belfast City Hall to 17 specific days throughout the year in December 2012, Farry's constituency office in Bangor was the subject of an attempted arson attack.

In February 2013, he launched a review of apprenticeships and youth training, aiming to build a "gold standard" system capable of "rebalancing of the local economy and meeting the specific needs of business for a highly-skilled workforce". The 32 proposals launched by the department in June 2014 included incentives for businesses, and were welcomed by the Confederation of British Industry, the Federation of Small Businesses and NUS-USI.

Following the 2016 elections, Farry had been tipped by The Irish News to succeed David Ford as Minister of Justice. However, with the Alliance Party opting to enter opposition, he returned to the backbench. He subsequently assumed positions on the Stormont Committee for the Economy and Business Committee, remaining on these until the collapse of the Assembly in February 2017.

Deputy Leader of the Alliance Party (2016-) 
Following the resignation of David Ford as Alliance leader on 5 October 2016, Farry was named by The Irish Times as a potential leadership contender alongside Naomi Long. However, he did not stand as a leadership candidate and was later elected unopposed as Deputy Leader of the party.

At the 2017 Assembly election, Farry increased his share of first-preference votes in North Down to 7,014 (18.6%) and was re-elected on the first count. He currently serves as Alliance's Brexit spokesperson and has strongly advocated for a People's Vote, argued against a no-deal Brexit and maintained that the Northern Ireland backstop must be part of any Withdrawal Agreement should the UK leave the European Union.

Member of Parliament (2019-) 
On 13 December 2019, Farry was elected to represent the constituency of North Down in the 2019 general election. Farry replaced long-term incumbent Lady Hermon, who had stepped down at the election after eighteen years as an Ulster Unionist, and later independent, MP. He made his maiden speech on 20 December 2019, starting his speech speaking in Irish to "reflect the shared traditions of Northern Ireland"; it was the first time since 1901 that a maiden speech had been conducted in Irish, when Thomas O'Donnell was chastised by the then-Speaker for not speaking in English in the chamber.

In May 2020, Farry was one of a number of politicians warned that he was under threat from loyalist paramilitaries. The threat was believed to have come from elements of the UDA in south-east Antrim.

Personal life 
In 2005, Farry married Wendy Watt. He lists his recreations as travel and international affairs.

References

External links

1971 births
Living people
People from Newtownards
Alliance Party of Northern Ireland MLAs
Members of North Down Borough Council
Mayors of places in Northern Ireland
Northern Ireland MLAs 2007–2011
Northern Ireland MLAs 2011–2016
Northern Ireland MLAs 2016–2017
Northern Ireland MLAs 2017–2022
Ministers of the Northern Ireland Executive (since 1999)
UK MPs 2019–present
Members of the Parliament of the United Kingdom for County Down constituencies (since 1922)
Alliance Party of Northern Ireland MPs
Alliance Party of Northern Ireland councillors
People educated at Our Lady and St. Patrick's College, Knock